Alfred Pretty (29 January 1874 – 21 June 1929) was an Australian cricketer. He played in one first-class match for South Australia in 1908/09.

See also
 List of South Australian representative cricketers

References

External links
 

1874 births
1929 deaths
Australian cricketers
South Australia cricketers
Cricketers from Adelaide